The Kent Police Museum is located at Faversham Police Station in Kent, England. The museum was previously located within Chatham Dockyard. In September 2015 it relocated to temporary accommodation at the Kent Police Headquarters in Maidstone, and moved to Faversham on 8 Dec 2016. The museum is staffed by volunteers, and holds monthly events.

The museum includes displays on the history of the Kent County Constabulary which was established in 1857, as well as the  fourteen earlier borough or city police forces, all of which had amalgamated with Kent County Constabulary by 1943.

The museum's memorabilia collections include, uniforms, equipment, medals, photographs, scenes of crime evidence, and occurrence and charge books. Its collection was started in the 1960s and the museum was first opened in 1973.

The museum is home to the world's largest working padlock.

References

External links

Museums in the Borough of Swale
Law enforcement museums in England
Museums in Kent
Buildings and structures in Faversham